Hartlepool United Football Club is a professional association football club based in Hartlepool, County Durham, England. The team competes in League Two, the fourth tier of the English football league system.

They were founded in 1908 as Hartlepools United Football Athletic Company. West Hartlepool won the FA Amateur Cup in 1905 and after the club was dissolved in 1910 its assets and liabilities were subsequently taken over by Hartlepools United, who were then playing in the North Eastern League. Hartlepools United were elected into the Football League in 1921 and would spend the next 37 years in the Third Division North, at which point they were placed into the Fourth Division. In 1968, the s and the United of the club's name were removed due to the merger of West Hartlepool with the town of Hartlepool and the village of Hart - forming the new borough of Hartlepool. The club won promotion in 1967–68 for the first time, though were relegated out of the Third Division the following season. In 1977, the United was added back to the team's name. They won another promotion in 1990–91, though were relegated in 1993–94. They won further promotions out of the fourth tier in 2002–03 and 2006–07, having been relegated again in 2005–06 after losing the 2005 League One play-off final to Sheffield Wednesday in the previous season. Hartlepool were relegated again in 2012–13 and ended their 96-year run in the Football League with relegation into the National League in 2016–17. Hartlepool achieved promotion back to the Football League in 2020–21, beating Torquay United in the 2021 National League play-off final.

Hartlepool have played home games at Victoria Park throughout their history. Their main rival is Darlington. The club's mascot, 'H'Angus the Monkey', was elected mayor at the 2002 Hartlepool Borough Council election. The club also receives vocal support from Sky Sports presenter Jeff Stelling. Between 1924 and 1984, Hartlepool had to apply for re-election on fourteen occasions (a record) in the fourth tier of English football; however, they were not relegated from this level until 2017. The club is also known for being the one that Brian Clough started his managerial career. The club's record appearance holder is Ritchie Humphreys, who made 543 appearances, while their leading scorer is Joshie Fletcher with 111 goals.

History

1908–45: Early years and formation
Hartlepool's origins can be traced back to 1881 when West Hartlepool Amateur Football Club were founded, later joining as founder members of the Durham FA in 1883. In 1889, West Hartlepool subsequently joined the new Northern League before winning the FA Amateur Cup in 1905, beating Clapton 3–2.

Partly as a result of this victory, the opportunity for a professional team arose in 1908, when West Hartlepool Rugby Club went bust, leaving their stadium, the Victoria Ground vacant. The stadium was bought and the current club was founded under the name Hartlepools United Football Athletic Company on 1 June 1908, representing both the town of West Hartlepool and the original settlement of Hartlepool, known locally as "Old Hartlepool". On 2 September 1908, Hartlepools played their first match at Victoria Park, defeating Newcastle United 6–0.

The new team joined the professional North-Eastern league in 1908. West Hartlepool managed to continue for a few seasons however it was not long before they broke up leaving Hartlepools United as the only team in town. In 1910, the club took over the assets and liabilities of West Hartlepool who had been dissolved that year. In 1921, Hartlepools were elected to the newly formed Football League, joining the Football League Third Division. On 27 August 1921, Hartlepools played their first ever Football League match, defeating Wrexham 2–0. In 1921–22, Hartlepools finished their first Football League campaign in 4th place.

1945–89: Post-war
On 31 August 1946, Hartlepools played their first game after World War Two, drawing 1–1 with Barrow. In 1956, Hartlepools narrowly lost 1–0 to First Division champions Chelsea in the FA Cup. In the subsequent FA Cup campaign, Hartlepools lost 4–3 to Manchester United. The attendance of 17,426 remains the club's highest attendance. Hartlepools managed to fight back from 3–0 down to level the game at 3–3 before Manchester United scored a late winner. The Red Devils' manager Matt Busby described it as "the most exciting match I've ever watched" in his autobiography. In 1956–57, Hartlepools finished 2nd to Derby County, missing out on promotion to the Second Division. In 1958, the club were placed in the newly formed Fourth Division. During 1959, Hartlepools defeated Barrow 10–1, a club record victory for a League match which remains to this day.
 
Brian Clough was invited to manage Hartlepools in 1965 at the age of 30. His reaction was "I don't fancy the place", but he took the job anyway alongside Peter Taylor. In order to generate funds for the club, Clough visited every pub in town. In May 1966, Clough gave future European Cup winning captain John McGovern his professional debut aged 16 years old. After Clough and Taylor left for Derby County, the club maintained their form and were promoted for the first time in their history after defeating Swansea Town 2–0. In 1968 the "s" and the "United" were dropped from the team name of "Hartlepools United". This was due to the merger of West Hartlepool with the older smaller town of Hartlepool and the village of Hart into one new borough named "Hartlepool". However, Hartlepool were relegated the following season after finishing in 22nd place.

Under Len Ashurst (who became manager in 1971), the team slowly began to revive after years of largely indifferent form. The 1971–72 season saw a welcome improvement to 18th, and possibly saved the club; Barrow, who had finished bottom the previous year, were voted out in favour of Hereford United despite having improved to 22nd. The club once again avoided the re-election zone in 1972–73, finishing in 20th place, but with four successive finishes either in or not far above the bottom four and strong challenges coming from non-league sides, the club needed to show signs of improvement. Ashurst did precisely that, finishing in 11th in 1973–74; he then left the club to manage Gillingham.

Ken Hale took over and guided the team to 13th and 14th over the next two seasons. The club also reached the League Cup fourth round in 1974–75 (still a club record) where they lost a replay to eventual winners Aston Villa. However, 1976–77 saw a return to the doldrums; Hale was sacked after failing to win any of the first nine games at the start of October. His successor Billy Horner could not stop the rot either, and the team finished in 22nd place. Again there was a strong challenger from non-league in the form of Wimbledon; however, as the club was seeking re-election for the first time in six years, it was Workington – bottom for a second successive year that made way. Over the close season the team's name was changed to its current form of Hartlepool United. A tragedy struck the club a few weeks before the end of the season when 20-year-old player Dave Wiggett was killed in a car crash.

A marginal improvement to 21st the following year again saw the club applying to stay in the league; and again a strong non-league challenge, this time from Wigan Athletic, was enough to dispose of Southport. It seemed to be only a matter of time before Hartlepool United followed the same way. Once again then, it was a huge relief for the supporters that Horner managed to make considerable improvements the following season. A large part of this was due to the strike partnership of Bob Newton and Keith Houchen; the latter would be the club's leading scorer in each of the following four seasons. There was also relative success in the FA Cup, with Crystal Palace being defeated at Victoria Park thanks to two goals from Newton as the club made the fourth round.

1978–79 saw a finish in 13th place; 19th the following season was still enough to stay clear of the re-election zone, and then 1980–81 saw the team produce its best season in over a decade, never being out of the top 10 and looking promotion contenders for a long spell before falling away to finish ninth. Financial issues were however making waves off the pitch and in particular the ownership of the ground. The Town Council were approached by the club with a view to buying the ground in January 1977, and although this was initially turned down, negotiations continued. In February 1978, a deal seemed to have been agreed; however chairman Vince Barker accused the council of delaying the deal when it was not complete 12 months later. Barker would accuse the council of trying to renege on the deal in July 1980, and even threatened to move the club out of the town amidst rumours that he was prepared to sell up and allow the club to be moved to Scarborough.

1981–82 saw the team finish in 14th place despite both Houchen and Newton scoring 18 goals, but their partnership was drawing to a close and with it four seasons of relative success. The club was running into financial difficulties under Vince Barker, and both forwards would be sold the following season for fees that failed to reflect their value to the club but allowed bills to be paid. The team finished in 22nd – back in the re-election zone. Billy Horner handed over his duties at the end of March to John Duncan. Duncan's time at the club was limited. Having been appointed in April, just nine weeks later he left to take over at Chesterfield. Hartlepool appointed Mick Docherty; however after six months and with the team struggling, he too left the club. Even for Hartlepool, four managers in the space of eight months was somewhat farcical; the fact that the decision was made to re-appoint Billy Horner (initially as a temporary measure, although he would actually remain in charge until November 1986) made the situation even worse.

Dissatisfaction with the club's board grew; attendances fell; performances remained poor. An eventual finish of 23rd, and a club record low attendance of 790 for the game with Stockport County on 5 May 1984, showed a club that looked to be going nowhere. The application for re-election was again successful, with the club once more polling the lowest figure of the League clubs, the result was secured on the back of an agreement being made amongst the club chairmen to enter into meaningful dialogue over direct promotion and relegation with the Alliance Premier League. Many felt that without that agreement being made, Hartlepool United would have been voted out because of their perennial re-election applications. Maidstone United were the unfortunate non-league champions to have the Football League door slammed in their faces for the second year running. During the close season chairman Barker left the club, John Smart taking over. Once again though Horner managed to produce an improvement, to 19th, before making a team that looked capable of winning promotion. After a shaky start to 1985–86, the team climbed into the top three by mid-October; were still in a promotion spot in early March; and eventually faded slightly to finish in seventh place.

Any hopes that Horner might lead the club to promotion faded shortly after the start of the 1986–87 season. After drawing the first four games of the season, Pools then lost the next four before finally recording their first win against Lincoln City in the ninth game; a further six games without a win were enough to see the club looking in serious danger of being the first club to be automatically relegated from the Football League and saw Horner depart. He was replaced by John Bird, a former player at the club. Form improved slightly, but although the team eventually finished in relative safety in 18th, they were only three points ahead of Lincoln City who suffered relegation. One peculiarity of the season concerned Middlesbrough; the financially struggling Teessiders had been locked out of their ground Ayresome Park, but were due to play a home game on the opening day of the season. Had they not fulfilled the fixture they would have been expelled from the League; Hartlepool stepped into the breach and offered the use of the Victoria Ground. After Hartlepool's draw with Cardiff City in the afternoon, Middlesbrough played their game with Port Vale the same evening.

The following season saw an improvement to 16th place, this time comfortably above relegated Newport County and in fact only 11 points from the playoff places; however a poor run of form towards the end of the season (four points from the last 10 games) cost the team any hope of promotion. Notable events from the season included both Paul Baker and Andy Toman scoring 20 or more goals in all competitions, and beating neighbours Sunderland in the Associate Members Cup before eventually losing out to Preston North End in the Northern semi-final. Bird had however made something of a name for himself as a manager, and when early season form saw Hartlepool United in second place at the end of September 1988, he left the club to join York City. Former Newcastle United captain Bobby Moncur was appointed to succeed Bird, but failed to inspire the team; results suffered with Hartlepool eventually finishing 19th. Five successive league defeats opened the 1989–90 season, and Moncur eventually resigned in November with the club rooted to the bottom of the table having taken just nine points from 18 games with 46 goals conceded.

1989–97: The Gibson and Hornsey years
The new manager appointed though would become a legend at the club. Cyril Knowles had been a distinguished player, and had a growing reputation as a manager; with the addition of several new signings, he achieved a remarkable turnaround. From having 9 points from 19 games, Knowles led the side to 55 by the end of the season – and a safe 19th place in the table. Even better was to follow the next season. With the partnership of Paul Baker and Joe Allon working well in attack, the team were in the top 10 for much of the season and in with a good chance of reaching a play-off place. Then, tragedy struck in February 1991 when Knowles was diagnosed with brain cancer and Alan Murray took over on a temporary basis. Under Murray, the team's form improved further and the club went into the final day of the season as one of several clubs that could win not just promotion but the title. A 3–1 win over Northampton Town was enough to secure promotion in third place.

However, Knowles was still suffering from cancer and in June 1991 Murray was given the manager's job on a permanent basis as Knowles had now undergone three operations but still had the cancer. He died on 30 August 1991, aged 47. Although Allon signed for Chelsea over the close season, Murray was able to retain the majority of the squad, and also signed players such as Andy Saville and Lenny Johnrose as the club finished in a highly respectable 11th in the Third Division. The 1992–93 season saw the club playing in the new Division Two, as the formation of the Premier League had caused a re-labelling of the divisions. By October, the team was in second place, level on points with leaders West Bromwich Albion. The club remained in the play-off hunt until New Year, and then achieved one of the best results in its history after beating Crystal Palace 1–0 in the FA Cup third round – the first time that Hartlepool had beaten a top division side. However, this would prove to be the end of the club's success for several years. It was revealed shortly after the cup win that the club were in financial difficulties. To make ends meet, a number of players were released or sold, and the club set an unenviable record by going 1,227 minutes without scoring. During this run Murray was sacked and replaced by Viv Busby. The club eventually escaped relegation, finishing 16th.

The following season was an unmitigated disaster. With no money to bring in players, the team struggled all season. Busby was replaced in November 1993 by John MacPhail, but he could do little as the team remained in the relegation places from November until the end of the season. Relegation was assured following a 7–0 defeat at Rotherham United; the final day of the season saw the team thrashed 8–1 by Plymouth Argyle at the Victoria Ground. The next five seasons saw constant struggle and a succession of managers. Gibson finally sold the club to local businessman Harold Hornsey, who at least was able to financially stabilise the club; but with little money available for players times were hard. MacPhail left early in 1994–95 and was replaced by Dave McCreery; he was replaced towards the end of the same season by Keith Houchen, who had returned as a player. Houchen was in turn replaced after 18 months by Mick Tait. Meanwhile, the club finished in 18th, 20th (twice) and 17th. There was also a change of ownership in 1997: Hornsey sold the club to an IOR Ltd, with Ken Hodcroft becoming chairman.

1997–2012: Success under IOR
Matters came to a head in 1998–99; Tait's side were struggling, and even the signing of former England international Peter Beardsley had not changed the club's fortunes. Tait was sacked in January 1999, and Chris Turner was appointed; despite being four points adrift at the bottom of the League at Easter, Turner was able to prevent the club being relegated. Under Turner, matters improved drastically. In 1999–2000 they reached the play-offs, but were beaten by local rivals Darlington in the semi-finals. Pools qualified for the play-offs for the next two seasons as well – though on both occasions they were defeated in the semi-finals by Blackpool and Cheltenham Town respectively. In 2002–03, Hartlepool finished in second place and won automatic promotion to the Second Division for the third time in the club's history. Turner had however left to take over Sheffield Wednesday part way through the season with Mike Newell replacing him. Hartlepool had been at the top of the league for the majority of the season but could only win one match from their final four, meaning that Rushden & Diamonds won the league. Newell was relieved of his duties over the close season, with Neale Cooper replacing him in June 2003. Hartlepool enjoyed an exceptional campaign in 2003–04, with highlights including an 8–1 victory over Grimsby Town and a trip to Sunderland in the third round of the FA Cup (followed by 9,109 away supporters). They finished sixth and secured a play-off place on the final day of the season with a 1–1 draw away at Swindon Town. However, they lost to third-placed Bristol City in the play-offs by 3–2 on aggregate. The season also saw Eifion Williams called up to the Wales squad and looked set to become only the second Hartlepool player ever to win an international cap while at the club; however he had to withdraw due to injury.

The club finished sixth in the league again in the 2004–05 season, despite the departure of Cooper just before the end of the season due to personal issues. In the play-off semi-final, they defeated Tranmere Rovers 6–5 on penalties after the sides had each won their home leg 2–0. The club failed to win promotion, losing 4–2 to Sheffield Wednesday after extra time in front of an attendance of 59,808 in the play-off final. Hartlepool had been leading 2–1 with eight minutes of regular time to go, but a controversial penalty decision in the 82nd minute, which also saw Chris Westwood sent off, allowed Sheffield Wednesday to level the scores making it 2–2 at the end of 90 minutes. Hartlepool struggled in extra time and conceded two further goals. Following this achievement Cooper's assistant Martin Scott was appointed as manager. The 2005–06 season saw the side slip down the division to the relegation places helped in part by poor management, an indecisive board room and key player injuries. Manager Martin Scott was suspended after an alleged fight with a player in the changing rooms, which resulted in his dismissal. Youth team coach Paul Stephenson was put in charge until the end of the season, aided by former manager Chris Turner who returned to the club as Director of Sport, nevertheless, he could not prevent the club being relegated into the fourth tier in May 2006.

In June 2006, Danny Wilson was appointed as the new manager. Under Wilson, Hartlepool returned to League One at the first time of asking, finishing second behind champions Walsall. On 1 January 2007, Hartlepool United equalled the all-time Football League record of consecutive wins without conceding a goal by winning 1–0 at Mansfield Town; this had been the eighth straight win without conceding. Hartlepool sealed promotion with an away win at Wycombe Wanderers but missed out on the title on the final day after losing 2–1 at home to Bristol Rovers. However, it was a very successful season which saw Hartlepool go 23 games unbeaten during the season. They maintained their League One status by finishing 15th in the 2007–08 season. On 19 October 2007, tragedy struck when midfielder Michael Maidens died aged 20 years old. In December 2008, Danny Wilson was sacked; while the club were unbeaten in four games and well clear of the relegation zone, the board felt that Wilson could take the club no further. Chris Turner was quickly returned to the managerial position, combining the role with his existing position as the club's Director of Sport. In the 2008–09 season, Hartlepool celebrated their centenary season with a run in the FA Cup and League Cup: beating Premier League sides Stoke City and West Brom. Pools stayed up on the final day of the season despite losing 4–1 to Bristol Rovers.

In 2009–10 Hartlepool finished in 20th place. Hartlepool had received a three-point deduction for fielding an ineligible player during a victory over Brighton. The club survived on the final day of the season with a 0–0 draw against Brentford being enough to keep them in League One, albeit on goal difference alone. Chris Turner resigned from the club a few weeks into the following season and Mick Wadsworth took over on a temporary basis, before being appointed permanently a month later. The 2010–11 season ended up going much the same as the previous one, with the club in play-off contention in the middle of the campaign before falling away as the season went on. However, the drop in Hartlepool's form was not as severe as it had been in the previous two seasons, and they finished in 16th place, well clear of the relegation zone. A peculiarity of the season saw Hartlepool's goalkeeper Scott Flinders score a late equaliser in a 2–2 draw with AFC Bournemouth. The club started the following 2011–12 season well but a bad run of form resulted in the sacking of Wadsworth in December, with former manager Neale Cooper returning to the club as his replacement. While Cooper was not able to get the club back to their early form, the side stayed generally consistent for the remainder of the season and secured a 13th-place finish.

2012–18: Decline and relegation into non-League football
The following 2012–13 season started with just one win in fourteen league games, and in the wake of a defeat by Bury, which moved Hartlepool to the bottom of the table, Cooper resigned, bringing an end to his second spell after less than a year. He was replaced by Livingston manager John Hughes, and while the club's form gradually improved, they were ultimately unable to overcome the first half of the season, which saw them secure 9 points and just one win from their first 23 games. Hartlepool finished second-bottom of the league after six seasons in the third tier. Hughes publicly stated that he wanted to remain as manager despite the relegation, however, he was sacked by Hodcroft and replaced by Colin Cooper.

After an extensive overhaul of the playing squad during the summer, Hartlepool finished the 2013–14 season in 19th-place that season, their lowest finish in 15 years. In the 2014–15 season, Cooper resigned a few weeks into the campaign following a 3–0 home defeat to Carlisle United which left Hartlepool at the bottom of the Football League. Paul Murray replaced Cooper, only to be sacked just two months later, with the club six points adrift at the bottom of League Two, and having just suffered an FA Cup elimination at the hands of non-League Blyth Spartans. Ken Hodcroft resigned and sold the club to Peter Harris in December 2014. Harris' first decision was to appoint former Tranmere Rovers manager Ronnie Moore to the managers' job. The takeover ultimately fell through due to Harris and his associates being involved in dubious activities with the club reverting to Hodcroft's ownership.  After being ten points adrift in bottom place at the turn of the year, in what has been termed the "great escape" and "miracle", a revival in form saw Hartlepool escape the relegation places and secure survival in the penultimate game of the season.

June 2015 saw a change of ownership, handing over to Essex recruitment firm JPNG (liquidated in 2017), which appointed director Gary Coxall as chairman. By February 2016, with Hartlepool in 21st place, JPNG decided to sack Ronnie Moore and replaced him with Craig Hignett. Pools stabilised under Hignett, ending the season in 16th-place. The 2016–17 season started with Hignett being sacked in January 2017 and replaced by Dave Jones. Form under Jones deteriorated further, with only 13 points gained from a possible 54. With three games to go, Hartlepool dropped into the relegation zone for the first time after a loss at home to Barnet. That result prompted a passionate rant by Jeff Stelling live on Soccer Saturday, which resulted in the sacking of Dave Jones. The final round of fixtures meant either Newport County or Hartlepool would be relegated to the National League. After being 1–0 down to Doncaster Rovers, Hartlepool looked doomed. Substitute Devante Rodney scored two unanswered goals to leave Hartlepool above the relegation zone, however, an 89th-minute goal for Newport consigned Hartlepool to non-league football for the first time after 96 years in the Football League.

Craig Harrison was appointed as manager ahead of Hartlepool's first campaign in non-League. By November, off-field financial issues intensified which coincided with a winless run of eleven games. In a statement, Pam Duxbury (then chairwoman) claimed that a number of "legacy issues have consumed high financial and human resources" and that the club needed £200,000 in order to survive. In response to the financial issues, fans set up a JustGiving page which raised just over £85,000, including donations from supporters across the UK. An initiative called 'Save Pools Day' took place on 20 January 2018 for a fixture against Wrexham where supporters from other clubs visited to raise funds via ticket sales and other fundraising methods. The poor run of form resulted in the sacking of Craig Harrison in February who was replaced by caretaker manager Matthew Bates. In March 2018, Hartlepool Borough Council agreed to lend the club £77,500 to help the club during its financial crisis. Hartlepool won three consecutive matches to pull away from the relegation places and finally guaranteed safety from relegation in April. Hartlepool's first season in non-League ended with the club avoiding liquidation when Raj Singh bought the club in April. Hartlepool ultimately finished a turbulent season in 15th place.

2018–present: Raj Singh

Pools started the 2018–19 season brightly, however, six consecutive defeats, culminating in Hartlepool's lowest league home attendance since 1998 forced Raj Singh to sack Bates after 9 months in charge. He was replaced by the experienced Richard Money. However, after only six matches in charge, Money decided the job wasn't for him and switched roles with director of football Craig Hignett in January 2019. Hignett guided Hartlepool to a disappointing 16th-place finish - the lowest league finish in the club's history. Early in 2019–20 Raj Singh took the decision to sack Craig Hignett and replaced him with Dave Challinor. Pools' league form improved under Challinor, however, the COVID-19 pandemic forced the cancellation of the season after 39 games with league positions decided on a points-per-game basis with Hartlepool placed in 12th.

In 2020–21, Hartlepool earned promotion to League Two at the fourth attempt via the play-offs. The season was defined by the COVID-19 pandemic with the vast majority of fixtures being played behind closed doors. Hartlepool finished 4th in the regular season, meaning that they met Bromley in the play-off eliminator which they won 3–2. In the semi-final, Hartlepool won 1–0 at Stockport County thanks to a goal by Rhys Oates. In the 2021 play-off final, Hartlepool played Torquay United at Ashton Gate with Hartlepool taking the lead via Luke Armstrong in the first half. However, Torquay equalised in the 95th minute thanks to a header by the goalkeeper Lucas Covolan to take the match to extra time and then penalties. Hartlepool managed to win the shootout 5–4, which ended their four-year spell in non-league.

After a four-year hiatus from League football, Hartlepool won their first match back in League Two, beating Crawley Town 1–0. In September 2021, Challinor signed a new three-year contract, however in November 2021 he decided to join non-League side Stockport County. In December 2021, former defender Graeme Lee was announced as the new manager. He was dismissed after only five months, following a run of 11 games with only one win. Hartlepool ultimately finished a turbulent season back in the Football League in 17th whilst maintaining two strong cup runs. Pools reached the fourth round of the FA Cup before succumbing to Premier League side Crystal Palace 2–0 backed by nearly 5,000 away fans. In the EFL Trophy, Hartlepool reached the semi-finals for the first time before losing out on penalties to Rotherham United.

In June 2022, Cove Rangers manager Paul Hartley was appointed as the new manager, but only lasted 3 months after a disastrous start to the 2022–23 season left them without a win after 9 league games. Keith Curle was appointed as his replacement on an interim basis before becoming the permanent manager in December 2022.

Recent seasons
Statistics from the previous decade. For a full history see; List of Hartlepool United F.C. seasons

Club identity

Sponsorship
Erreà currently manufactures the club's apparel. The current home shirt sponsor are Suit Direct  and the current away shirt sponsor is the Durata.

Table of kit suppliers and shirt sponsors appear below:

Stadium

The home of Hartlepool United has been Victoria Park since the club's formation in 1908. The ground is currently under the ownership of Hartlepool Borough Council.

The capacity of the ground is 7,856. The four stands of the ground are the Brunel Group Stand/Town End (1,599 capacity), the Teesside Airport Neale Cooper Stand (1,617 seated and 1,832 standing), the Rink End/Simpson Millar Stand - which is used for away supporters (1,003 capacity) and the Longbranch Homes Cyril Knowles Stand (1,775 capacity).

The ground was bought by Hartlepools United following the bankruptcy of the local rugby club which had purchased the ground in 1886. The ground was named in celebration of Queen Victoria's Diamond Jubilee. In 1916, the stand on Clarence Road (the current location of the Cyril Knowles Stand) was bombed by a German Zeppelin and was completely destroyed. The club attempted to claim compensation from the German government but failed. A temporary stand was introduced and was used until the Cyril Knowles Stand was completed in 1995 in memory of former manager Cyril Knowles who had died in 1991. Furthermore, following the death of former manager Neale Cooper in 2018, the Cameron's Brewery Stand was renamed in his memory.

Due to sponsorship reasons, the ground was formerly named as the Northern Gas and Power Stadium (2016–17) and the Super 6 Stadium (2018–19). On 12 November 2021, it was announced that the stadium would be named the 'Suit Direct Stadium' after a three-year partnership was signed with the menswear high street retailer Suit Direct.

Popular culture

Andy Capp
The comic strip Andy Capp, which was created by Hartlepool native Reg Smythe, has referred specifically to the team and the Cyril Knowles stand.

Mascot elected mayor

In the 2002 council election, the team's mascot "H'Angus the Monkey", aka Stuart Drummond, was elected mayor of Hartlepool as an independent, under the slogan "free bananas for schoolchildren". Even though his candidacy was just a publicity stunt, Drummond has since been re-elected after throwing off his comedy image and identifying himself increasingly with the Labour group on the council. On 5 May 2013, Drummond left his post of Hartlepool's mayor after a November 2012 referendum meant that Hartlepool would no longer have a mayor, instead being led by committees.

Supporters and rivalries
In 2003, market research company FFC surveyed fans of every Football League club across the country to find who they consider their main rivals to be. Hartlepool United fans chose Darlington as their main rivals. Additionally, in 2008, 95% of both clubs named each other as their biggest rivals. Between the two clubs, Hartlepool have won 60 games, compared to Darlington's 57 games in the rivalry. However, the two clubs haven't met since 2007 in a League meeting due to Darlington's financial issues and subsequent relegations. Hartlepool's other rivals according to the 2003 report include: Sheffield Wednesday, Carlisle United, Rushden & Diamonds (now extinct) and Sunderland respectively.

In 2015, a Hartlepool United's Supporters Trust was founded with the intention of "articulating the views of Hartlepool United supporters, lobby the club and provide the basis for some element of fan involvement and influence with the football club."

Famous fans
In recent years the most visible fan of the club has been Jeff Stelling, presenter of Soccer Saturday on Sky Sports. Stelling is currently Club President (2018–) and formerly Honorary President of the Hartlepool United Supporters' Trust (2017–2018).  Janick Gers, of the metal band Iron Maiden, is a season ticket holder in the Neale Cooper Stand.

Cricket umpire Michael Gough is also a fan of the club and in January 2021 was appointed Honorary President of the Hartlepool United Supporters' Trust. Hartlepool born sportspeople Savannah Marshall and Graeme Storm are also fans of Pools and it has been reported that the actor Christopher Timothy is also a fan but as Timothy is from Wales, it is unclear what his connection to the town is. Fellow actor Philip Middlemiss, who is from the town, is also a fan of the club.

In 2003, rock star Meat Loaf revealed on Soccer AM he was a fan of Hartlepool. On So Graham Norton later in the same year, he spoke about his support for the club and brought a cuddly H'Angus toy on the show. It was reported in the media that he was looking to purchase a house in the town. Speaking to Setanta Sports News in 2008, he commented on Hartlepool's recent victory but said that while amusing, the story about him looking to buy a house in the town was not true. In an interview with Talksport in 2010, Meat Loaf confirmed he still followed Hartlepool's results. Following his death in January 2022, the club paid tribute to Meat Loaf.

Fancy dress tradition
In recent years, on the final away match of each season, Hartlepool fans get dressed up in fancy dress in a pre-agreed theme. This has included NHS workers, knights, clowns, penguins, Where's Wallys, mime artists, Morris dancers, Smurfs, Stormtroopers, Thunderbirds and Oompa-Loompas in recent years.

Records and statistics
The record for most appearances for Hartlepool is held by Ritchie Humphreys, who played 543 matches in all competitions between 2001 and 2013. Joshie Fletcher is the club's top goalscorer with 111 goals in all competitions. The first and only player to be capped at international level while playing for Hartlepool was Ambrose Fogarty, when he played for the Republic of Ireland against Spain in 1964.

Hartlepool's largest league victory was a 10–1 win over Barrow in the Fourth Division in 1959, while the heaviest loss was 10–1 to Wrexham in 1962 also in the Fourth Division. Their widest winning margin in the FA Cup was a 10–1 win against St Peters Albion in 1923. Hartlepool's record defeat in the FA Cup was by 6–0 against Manchester City in 1976 and Port Vale in 1994.

The club's highest attendance at Victoria Park was 17,264 against Manchester United in 1957. The lowest attendance was 380 in the EFL Trophy against Rochdale in 2016. The record attendance of any Hartlepool game was 59,808 at the Millennium Stadium, Cardiff for the 2005 Football League One play-off final. Hartlepool's highest average attendance during a league season was 9,248 during the 1951–52 season.

The youngest player to play for the club is David Foley, who was 16 years and 44 days on his debut against Port Vale in the Football League Second Division on 25 August 2003. The oldest player is Dimitrios Konstantopoulos, who played his last match aged 41 years and 15 days against Harrogate Town in the FA Trophy on 14 December 2019.

Club records 
As of the end of the 2021–22 season
Best FA Cup performance: Fourth round, 1954–55, 1977–78, 1988–89, 1992–93, 2004–05, 2008–09, 2021–22
Best League Cup performance: Fourth round, 1974–75
Best EFL Trophy performance: Semi-final, 2021–22
Best FA Trophy performance: Third round, 2020–21
Highest league finish: 2nd in Third Division North, equivalent to 47th in the English football league system, 1956–57
Seasons spent at Level 3 of the football league system: 43
Seasons spent at Level 4 of the football league system: 47
Seasons spent at Level 5 of the football league system: 4

Most appearances
As of 11 March 2023

Players

Current squad

Out on loan

Retired numbers

Notable former players
For all players with a Wikipedia article see Hartlepool United F.C. players

English Football Hall of Fame

Former Hartlepool United players or managers who have been inducted into the English Football Hall of Fame include:
 2002  Brian Clough
 2007  Peter Beardsley

Team of the Year
The following players have been included in the PFA Team of the Year or National League Team of the Year whilst playing for Hartlepool United:
 1989–90  Rob McKinnon
 1990–91  Joe Allon
 1997–98  Jon Cullen
 1999–2000  Tommy Miller
 2000–01  Tommy Miller
 2002–03  Graeme Lee,  Chris Westwood,  Mark Tinkler,  Ritchie Humphreys
 2006–07  Michael Nelson,  Ritchie Humphreys,  Andy Monkhouse
 2020–21  David Ferguson

Hartlepool United Ladies
In 2015, a Hartlepool United Ladies team was launched. In their first season, they finished 1st in the North East Regional Women's Football League Premier but would remain at this level for six years until they were relegated at the end of the 2021–22 season having finished 10th out of 11. They currently participate in the Northern division (6th tier of English women's football) and are managed by Craig Bage.

Club officials

Board

Coaching and medical staff

Former managers

Honours
Hartlepool United's honours include the following: 
Third tier (currently EFL League One) 
Play-off runners-up (1): 2004–05
Fourth tier (currently EFL League Two)
Runners-up (2): 2002–03, 2006–07
Promotion (2): 1967–68, 1990–91
Fifth tier (currently National League)
Play-off winners (1): 2020–21
FA Amateur Cup
Winners (1): 1904–05 (West Hartlepool)
 Durham Challenge Cup
 Winners (5): 1908–09, 1909–10, 1956–57, 1957–58, 2004–05

Notes

References

Other sources
 Middlesbrough played their first 2 games of the 1986/87 season at Hartlepool's Victoria Park
 Timeline of events from Pools Stats (archived)
 Manager History from Soccerbase (archived)
 Season by Season record from In the Mad Crowd (archived)
 Law, Ed, Hartlepool United, (Derby; Breedon Books, 1989), .

External links

 Official website
 NewsNow Hartlepool – Independent Hartlepool United news
 List of Hartlepool United historical kits
 Hartlepool United Supporters' Trust (HUST)
 Hartlepool United player and match database

 
Association football clubs established in 1908
English Football League clubs
Football clubs in County Durham
1908 establishments in England
Football clubs in England
National League (English football) clubs
North Eastern League